The 6th Pan Arab Games were held in Rabat, Morocco between August 8 and August 16, 1985. 3442 athletes from 17 countries participated in events in 18 sports.

Sports

Medals won by country

 
P
Pan Arab Games
Sport in Rabat
Pan Arab Games
Pan Arab Games
Multi-sport events in Morocco
Pan Arab Games, 1985
Pan Arab Games